Street of Memories is a 1940 American drama film directed by Shepard Traube, written by Robert Lees and Frederic I. Rinaldo, and starring Lynne Roberts, Guy Kibbee, John McGuire, Edward Gargan, Hobart Cavanaugh and Jerome Cowan. It was released on November 15, 1940, by 20th Century Fox.

Plot
Joe Manson has amnesia and gets in trouble quite often, however Catherine sees something in Joe and they end up getting married, after that, Joe gets into a fight and remembers being the son of a rich man from Chicago, unfortunately that's the only thing he remembers.

Cast  
Lynne Roberts as Catherine (Kitty) Foster
Guy Kibbee as Harry Brent
John McGuire as Joe Mason / Richard Havens
Edward Gargan as Mike Sullivan
Hobart Cavanaugh as Mr. Foster
Jerome Cowan as Mr. Gower
Charles Waldron as Richard Havens
Sterling Holloway as Student Barber
Scotty Beckett as Tommy Foster
Adele Horner as Mary Ann Foster
Pierre Watkin as Dr. Thornton

References

External links 
 

1940 films
20th Century Fox films
American drama films
1940 drama films
American black-and-white films
1940s English-language films
1940s American films